The 2021–22 Liga Premier de México season is part of the third-tier football league of Mexico. The tournament began  on 18 September 2021.

Offseason Changes
 Since 2021–22 season, the season will once again be divided into two tournaments: Apertura and Clausura.
 Calor returned from hiatus for 2021–22 season, after last season was on hiatus due to COVID-19.
 Aguacateros CDU returns to Serie B after an invite to participate in Serie A for the 2020–21 season when Serie B was suspended. Also Ciervos and Cuautla returns to Serie B.
 On July 30, 2021, Alebrijes de Oaxaca, Ángeles Morelos, Guerreros de Xico, Huracanes Izcalli and Lobos Huerta joined the league as expansion teams.
 On August 8, 2021, Aragón F.C. announced that it will not participate in the season for administrative reasons, the team had been announced as a new participant on July 30, 2021. 
 On September 10, 2021, Ángeles SUD F.C. Morelos was put on hiatus.

Teams
{{Location map+ |Mexico |width=600|float=right |caption=Location of teams in the 2021–22 Serie B|places=

Torneo Apertura

Standings

Positions by Round

Results

Regular Season statistics

Top goalscorers
Players sorted first by goals scored, then by last name.

Source:Liga Premier FMF

Hat-tricks

(H) – Home ; (A) – Away

Attendance

Per team

Source: Liga Premier FMF

Highest and lowest

Source: Liga Premier FMF

Liguilla
The four best teams play two games against each other on a home-and-away basis. The higher seeded teams play on their home field during the second leg. The winner of each match up is determined by aggregate score. In the semifinals, if the two teams are tied on aggregate the higher seeded team advances. In the final, if the two teams are tied after both legs, the match goes to extra time and, if necessary, a penalty shoot-out.

Semi-final
The first leg was played on 10 December, and the second leg was played on 13 December 2021.

First leg

Second leg

Final
The first leg was played on  16 December, and the second leg was played on 19 December 2021.

First leg

Second leg

Torneo Clausura
The Torneo Clausura began on 14 January 2022.

Season changes
 On February 15, 2022 C.D. Cuautla was excluded from the competition for not paying the debts to the league and the football federation, so it does not take part in the Clausura 2022 tournament.

Standings

Positions by Round

NOTE: Weeks 2 and 3 of the tournament were postponed due to administrative issues and COVID–19, so in practice they were played like weeks 13 and 14 of the tournament.

Results

Regular Season statistics

Top goalscorers
Players sorted first by goals scored, then by last name.

Source:Liga Premier FMF

Hat-tricks

(H) – Home ; (A) – Away

Attendance

Per team

Highest and lowest

Source: Liga Premier FMF

Liguilla
The four best teams play two games against each other on a home-and-away basis. The higher seeded teams play on their home field during the second leg. The winner of each match up is determined by aggregate score. In the semifinals, if the two teams are tied on aggregate the higher seeded team advances. In the final, if the two teams are tied after both legs, the match goes to extra time and, if necessary, a penalty shoot-out.

Semi-finals
The first legs will be played on 29 and 30 April, and the second legs will be played on 6 and 7 May 2022.

First leg

Second leg

Final
The first leg were played on 14 May, and the second leg were played on 21 May 2022.

First leg

Second leg

Coefficient table 

Last updated: April 23, 2022 Source: Liga Premier FMFP = Position; G = Games played; Pts = Points; Pts/G = Ratio of points to games played; GD = Goal difference

Promotion to Liga Premier – Serie A 
As champion of the two tournaments of the season, Aguacateros CDU won the right to be promoted to Liga Premier – Serie A.

See also 
2021–22 Liga MX season
2021–22 Liga de Expansión MX season
2021–22 Serie A de México season
2021–22 Liga TDP season

References

External links
 Official website of Liga Premier FMF

1